Live in Brussels '19 is the third in a trio of benefit live albums by Australian psychedelic rock band King Gizzard & the Lizard Wizard, which was released digitally to  Bandcamp on 15 January 2020. The previous two live albums, Live in Adelaide '19, and Live in Paris '19, were both released five days prior. The album debuted at number 34 on the ARIA Albums Chart.

Background 
The album features a set by the band performed at the Ancienne Belgique in Brussels on 8 and 9 October 2019.  The tracks come from eight of the band’s albums: Nonagon Infinity, Murder of the Universe, Infest the Rats' Nest, Fishing for Fishies, Gumboot Soup, Paper Mâché Dream Balloon, Oddments, and Float Along – Fill Your Lungs.

All of the proceeds have gone to Wires Wildlife Rescue, in response to the 2019–20 Australian bushfires.

Track listing 
Tracks 1–9 were recorded from the 8 October 2019 concert, and Tracks 10–17 were from the 9 October concert.

Personnel 
Credits for Live in Brussels '19 adapted from Bandcamp.

Michael Cavanagh – drums
Cook Craig – guitar, keyboards, vocals
Ambrose Kenny-Smith – harmonica, vocals, keyboards, percussion
Stu Mackenzie – vocals, guitar, keyboards, mixing
Eric Moore – drums
Lucas Harwood - bass
Joey Walker – guitar, vocals

Additional personnel
 Gaspard De Meulemeester – live recording
 Sam Joseph – live recording
 Stacey Wilson – live recording
 Jason Galea – cover design

Charts

See also
List of 2020 albums

References

2020 live albums
King Gizzard & the Lizard Wizard live albums